Marie-Hélène Prémont (born October 24, 1977) is a Canadian cross-country mountain biker. She is a 6-time Canadian Champion, represented Canada twice at the Olympics (2004, winning a silver medal, and 2008), a Commonwealth Games gold medalist, and from 2004 to 2008 was a regular medal winner on the UCI Mountain Bike World Cup cross country circuit.

Career
Born) in Quebec City, Quebec, Prémont rode for Oryx/Procycle from 1999–2004, and Mont-Velo/Liken. From June 2004 through 2008, and in 2012 she rode for the Rocky Mountain Bikes race team. For the  2009-2011 seasons she rode for the Maxxis-Rocky Mountain Team. She has been a member of the Canadian National team since 2000.

She has won the Canadian National Elite Women's Championship in 2003, 2004, 2005, 2006, 2007, and 2008.

She won a bronze in the 2003 World Cup circuit in Kaprun, Austria. At the 2004 Summer Olympics she won a silver medal. She won three silver medals in the 2004 World Cup Circuit in Mont-Sainte-Anne, Quebec, Fort William, Scotland and Livigno, Italy. She won two gold medals in the 2005 World Cup circuit in Spa Francorchamps, Belgium and Mont Sainte Anne, Quebec. She won two gold medals in the 2006 World Cup circuit at Mont Sainte Anne, Quebec and Schladming, Austria, and a bronze medal in the 2006 World Championships in Rotorua, New Zealand. At the 2006 Commonwealth Games in Melbourne, she won the gold medal. She won 3 silver medals in the 2007 World Cup season at Offenburg, Germany, St. Felicien, Quebec, and Maribor, Slovenia, and finished the 2007 World Cup season in 2nd place overall.

She had her best season ever in 2008 with two gold medals at Fort William and Mont-Sainte-Anne, three silver and three bronze medals and claiming first place overall after eight of the nine races of the 2008 WC season. She was the only woman to win a medal in every World Cup race she entered. At the 2008 Beijing Games, she was forced to retire from the race due to hyperventilation.

She decided to postpone retirement and race again in 2009. By Madrid she was back to her usual pace, finishing second just 4 seconds back after swapping the lead with Marga Fullana throughout the race. At Mont-Sainte-Anne in the 5th race of 2009, Marie was the victim of a flat and a fork lockout problem that resulted in a 10th-place finish, and a 13th place in XCO#6 at Bromont after some breathing difficulties limited her climbing ability. Marie finished on the podium again in 5th at the final 2009 World Cup Race in Schladming, finishing the World Cup season in 6th place overall.

After a battery of breathing tests in early August 2009, Marie was diagnosed with exercise induced asthma, first occurring at the Beijing Olympics in 2008 (likely ozone induced since the onset was sudden), and continuing to be a problem through most of the 2009 season. She now has a 
therapeutic use exception for the use of a Ventolin inhaler in competition.

2010 was a season that combined good fitness and performance with bad luck. There were podium finishes with a 4th at Offenburg and a silver medal in a tightly contested battle at Windham, NY.

At an April 2011 Rocky Mountain Bicycles press conference in Quebec City, Marie-Hélène announced that she would continue to compete on the World Cup circuit through the 2012 season with a goal of competing at the 2012 London Olympic Games.

2011 saw three podium finishes, in Offenburg, Mont Sainte-Anne and Windham.

She did not compete in the 2012 Olympics.

On Feb 27, 2013 she announced that she would be taking a sabbatical from MTB racing as she was pregnant with her first child.

She returned to competitive racing in 2014 for two races, the Canada Cup, taking Bronze, and the World Cup in August.

On August 5, 2016 it was announced that Premont will be inducted into The Canadian Cycling Hall of Fame. 

She formally announced her retirement from competition on October 16, 2016.

Personal life
She lives in Chateau Richer, QC.

The 55 km Véloroute Marie-Hélène-Prémont bike trail between Boischatel and Saint-Ferréol-les-Neiges is named for Prémont.

Major achievements

2000
 59th in World Cup MTB XCO#1, Napa Valley, CA 
 33rd in World Cup MTB XCO#2, Mazatlan, Mexico 
 9th in Canada Cup MTB XC#1, Hardwood Hills, ON 
 5th in Canada Cup MTB XC#2, Mont Treblant, QC 
 33rd in World Championships, Sierra Nevada, Spain 
 21st in World Cup MTB XCO#6, Mont Sainte-Anne, Quebec 
 16th in World Cup MTB XCO#7, Canmore, AB 
 5th in National Championships MTB, Camp Fortune, QC 
 1st in Women's, Raid Pierre Harvey, MTB Marathon, Quebec 
 1st in Pan American Championships, MTB, Puerto Rico 
 4th in Canada Cup MTB XC#5, Silverstar, BC

2001
 23rd in World Cup MTB XCO#1, Napa Valley, CA
 1st in Camp Fortune/Quebec Cup #3, Camp Fortune, QC
 2nd in Canada Cup MTB XC#1, Hardwood Hills, ON
 2nd in Canada Cup MTB XC#2, Mont Tremblant, QC
 13th in World Cup MTB XCO#4, Grouse Mountain, BC
 1st in Canada Cup MTB XC#3, Fernie, BC
 2nd in Canada Cup MTB XC#4, Calgary, AB
 5th in National Championships MTB, Kamloops, BC
 DNF in Canada Cup MTB XC#5, Sun Peaks, BC
 15th in World Cup MTB XCO#8, Mont Sainte-Anne, Quebec
 1st in Quebec Cup, MTB XC, Bromont, QC
 1st in Pan American Championships, MTB, Brazil

2002
 29th in World Cup MTB XCO#1, Madrid, Spain
 16th in World Cup MTB XCO#2, Houffalize, Belgium
 1st in Canada Cup MTB XC#2, Hardwood Hills, ON
 5th in Canada Cup MTB XC#3, Mont.Tremblant, QC
 2nd in National Championships MTB, Kamloops, BC
 7th in World Cup MTB XCO#3, Mont Sainte-Anne, Quebec
 DNF World Cup MTB XCO#4, Grouse Mountain, BC
 4th in Commonwealth Games MTB, Manchester, UK
 16th in World Championships MTB, Kaprun Austria
 9th in World Cup MTB XCO#5, Les Gets, France
 3rd in Canadian Championship Cyclo-Cross, Elite Women, St.Augustin, QC

2003
 1st in Canada Cup MTB XC#1, Bromont, QC
 22nd in World Cup MTB XCO#1, St. Wendel, Germany
 9th in World Cup MTB XCO#2, Fort William, Scotland
 1st in Canada Cup MTB XC#3, Mt.Tremblant, QC
 5th in World Cup MTB XCO#3, Mont Sainte-Anne, Quebec
 n/a in World Cup MTB XCO#4 Telluride, CO, (event cancelled)
 4th in World Cup MTB XCO#5, Grouse Mountain, BC, Canada
 1st in National Championship, MTB, Whistler, BC,
 5th in World Championships MTB, Lugano, Switzerland
 3rd in World Cup MTB XCO#6, Kaprun, Austria
 4th in World Cup series overall, Elite Women MTB

2004
 10th in World Cup MTB XCO#1, Madrid, Spain
 6th in World Cup MTB XCO#2, Houffalize, Belgium
 2nd in World Cup MTB XCO#3, Fort William, Scotland
 no entry in World Cup MTB XCO#4, Schladming, Austria
 2nd in World Cup MTB XCO#5, Mont Sainte-Anne, Quebec
 1st in National Championship MTB, Mont Sainte-Anne, QC
 4th in World Cup MTB XCO#6, Calgary, Alberta
 2nd in Olympic Games, MTB, Athens, Greece
 4th in World Championships MTB, Les Gets, France
 2nd in World Cup MTB XCO#7, Livigno, Italy
 2nd in World Cup series overall, Elite Women MTB

2005
 1st in World Cup MTB XCO#1, Spa-Francorchamps, Belgium
 1st in Canada Cup MTB XC#1, Bromont, QC
 2nd in World Cup MTB XCO#2, Madrid, Spain
 4th in World Cup MTB XCO#3, Houffalize, Belgium
 3rd in World Cup MTB XCO#4, Willingen, Germany
 1st in National Championship, MTB, Mont Sainte Anne, QC
 1st in World Cup MTB XCO#5, Mont Sainte-Anne, Quebec
 no entry in World Cup MTB XCO#6, Santa Catarina, Brazil
 2nd in World Cup MTB XCO#7, Angel Fire Resort, USA
 4th in World Championships MTB, Livigno, Italy
 DNF in World Cup MTB  XCO#8, Fort William, Scotland (illness)
 3rd in World Cup series overall, Elite Women MTB

2006
 4th in World Cup MTB XCO#1, Curaçao
 1st in Commonwealth Games, MTB, Melbourne, Australia
 10th in World Cup MTB XCO#2, Madrid, Spain
 3rd in World Cup MTB XCO#3, Spa-Francorchamps, Belgium
 2nd in World Cup MTB XCO#4, Fort William, Scotland
 1st in Canada Cup MTB XC#3, Hardwood Hills, ON
 1st in World Cup MTB XCO#5, Mont Sainte-Anne, Quebec
 1st in Canada Cup MTB XC#4, Whistler, BC
 1st in National Championship, MTB, Sun Peaks Resort, BC
 3rd in World Championship, MTB, XC Elite, Rotorua, New Zealand
 1st in World Cup MTB XCO#6, Schladming, Austria
 2nd in World Cup series overall, Elite Women MTB

2007
 6th in World Cup MTB XCO#1, Houffalize, Belgium
 1st in Canada Cup MTB XC#1, Baie St.Paul, QC
 1st in Canada Cup MTB XC#2, Bromont, QC
 2nd in World Cup MTB XCO#2, Offenburg, Germany
 3rd in World Cup MTB XCO#3, Champery, Switzerland
 4th in World Cup MTB XCO#4, Mont Sainte-Anne, Quebec
 2nd in World Cup MTB XCO#5, Saint Félicien, Quebec
 1st in National Championship, MTB, Mt.Washington, BC
 4th in World Championships MTB, Fort William, Scotland
 2nd in World Cup MTB XCO#6, Maribor, Slovenia
 2nd in World Cup series overall, Elite Women MTB

2008
 3rd in World Cup MTB XCO#1, Houffalize, Belgium
 2nd in World Cup MTB XCO#2, Offenburg, Germany
 2nd in World Cup MTB XCO#3, Madrid, Spain
 3rd in World Cup MTB XCO#4, Vallnord, Andorra
 1st in World Cup MTB XCO#5, Fort William, Scotland
 4th in World Championships MTB, Val di Sole, Italy
 1st in National Championship, MTB, Mont Sainte Anne, QC
 1st in World Cup MTB XCO#6, Mont Sainte-Anne, QC
 2nd in World Cup MTB XCO#7, Bromont, QC
 DNF in Olympic Games, MTB, Beijing, China (asthma)
 no entry in World Cup MTB XCO#8, Canberra, Australia
 3rd in World Cup MTB XCO#9, Schladming, Austria
 1st in World Cup series overall, Elite Women MTB

2009
 no entry in World Cup MTB XCO#1, Pietermaritzburg, RSA
 14th in World Cup MTB XCO#2, Offenburg, Germany
 6th in World Cup MTB XCO#3, Houffalize, Belgium
 2nd in World Cup MTB XCO#4, Madrid, Spain
 2nd in National Championship, MTB, Saint Félicien, Quebec
 10th in World Cup MTB XCO#5, Mont Sainte-Anne, QC
 13th in World Cup MTB XCO#6, Bromont, QC
 12th in World Championships MTB, Canberra, Australia
 11th in World Cup MTB XCO#7, Champery, Switzerland
 5th in World Cup MTB XCO#8, Schladming, Austria
 6th in World Cup series overall, Elite Women MTB

2010
 8th in World Cup MTB XCO#1, Dalby Forest, Yorkshire, UK
 DNF in World Cup MTB XCO#2, Houffalize, Belgium (mechanical)
 4th in World Cup MTB XCO#3, Offenburg, Germany
 13th in World Cup MTB XCO#4, Champery, Switzerland
 8th in World Cup MTB XCO#5, Val di Sole, Italy
 2nd in World Cup MTB XCO#6, Windham, New York
 8th in World Cup series overall, Elite Women MTB
 9th in World Championships MTB, Mont Sainte-Anne, QC

2011
 9th in World Cup MTB XCO#1, Pietermaritzburg, RSA
 11th in World Cup MTB XCO#2, Dalby Forest, Yorkshire, UK
 4th in World Cup MTB XCO#3, Offenburg, Germany
 5th in World Cup MTB XCO#4, Mont Sainte-Anne, QC
 4th in World Cup MTB XCO#5, Windham, New York
 2nd in National Championship, MTB, Canmore, AB
 9th in World Cup MTB XCO#6, Nove Mesto Na Morave, CR
 11th in World Cup MTB XCO#7, Val di Sole, Italy
 4th in World Cup series overall, Elite Women MTB
 9th in World Championships MTB, Champery, Switzerland

2012
 21st in World Cup MTB XCO#1, Pietermaritzburg, RSA
 14th in World Cup MTB XCO#2, Houffalize, Belgium 
 9th in World Cup MTB XCO#3, Nove Mesto Na Morave, CR
 21st in World Cup MTB XCO#4, La Bresse, France
 2nd in National Championship, Saint Félicien, Quebec
 3rd in World Cup MTB XCO#5, Mont Sainte-Anne, QC
 4th in World Cup MTB XCO#6, Windham, New York
 14th in World Cup MTB XCO#7, Val D'Isere, France
 8th in World Cup series overall, Elite Women MTB
 38th in World Championships MTB, Saalfelden, Austria

References

External links

Official Marie-Hélène Prémont website
Canadian Cycling Association National Team Bio
Rocky Mountain Bicycles Team Bio

1977 births
Living people
Canadian female cyclists
Cross-country mountain bikers
Commonwealth Games gold medallists for Canada
Cyclists at the 2004 Summer Olympics
Cyclists at the 2008 Summer Olympics
Cyclists at the 2006 Commonwealth Games
Olympic cyclists of Canada
Olympic silver medalists for Canada
Cyclists from Quebec City
French Quebecers
Olympic medalists in cycling
Canadian mountain bikers
Medalists at the 2004 Summer Olympics
Commonwealth Games medallists in cycling
Medallists at the 2006 Commonwealth Games